The House of Cantemirești or House of Cantemir was a Moldavian ruling boyar family.

History 
The family was of Tatar origin, and came from Crimea in the 17th century. In the 17th and 18th centuries it brought forth several Voivodes of Moldavia. On 21 August 1723, the family got the title Prince of the Holy Roman Empire from Emperor Charles VI. During 18th century, they moved to Russia, Great Britain and France.

Notable members 

 Constantin Cantemir (died 1693), Voivode of Moldavia
 Antioh or Antioch Cantemir (died 1726), son of Constantin, Voivode of Moldavia
 Dimitrie or Demetrius Cantemir (died 1723), son of Constantin, Voivode of Moldavia and a prolific man of letters
 Antiochus or Antioch Cantemir (died 1744), son of Demetrius Cantemir, man of letters and Russian diplomat
 Ekaterina Dmitrievna Golicyna (died 1761), daughter of Dimitrie Cantemir, Russian noblewoman and Maid of honor

See also
Gantimurov family
Kantemirovka
Khan Temir

References

 
Romanian boyar families
Russian noble families
Moldavian nobility
Turkic dynasties